Lavoie Island is an uninhabited island located in Qikiqtaaluk Region, Nunavut, Canada. It is a Baffin Island offshore island in Hudson Strait, and a member of the Sheer Islands, along with Forder Island, Lee Island, and Wishart Island. It has been named after Constable Joseph Adolphe Arthur Lavoie who served in Royal Canadian Mounted Police (RCMP#10332) from July 4, 1927, to October 15, 1941.

References

Islands of Baffin Island
Islands of Hudson Strait
Uninhabited islands of Qikiqtaaluk Region